So Let Us Entertain You is the third studio album recorded by the American female vocal trio First Choice, released in 1976 on the Warner Bros./Philly Groove label.

History
The album features the song "Gotta Get Away (From You Baby)", which peaked at #64 on the Hot Soul Singles. Another single, "Let Him Go", had moderate success on the charts.

Track listing

Personnel
Ron "Have Mercy" Kersey – piano and clavinet
Charles Collins – drums
Dennis Harris, Bobby Eli, Norman Harris – guitars
Vincent Montana, Jr. – vibes
Michael "Sugar Bear" Foreman – bass
Larry Washington – congas and bongos
Stan "The Man" Watson – percussion
Don Renaldo & His Philadelphia Strings & Horns – strings

Charts

Singles

References

External links
 

1976 albums
First Choice (band) albums
Albums recorded at Sigma Sound Studios
Philly Groove Records albums
Warner Records albums